Scottie (1957–1981) was a stock horse who excelled in steer wrestling and was inducted into the ProRodeo Hall of Fame in 2016.

Background
Scottie was owned by Walt Linderman, who originally intended to use him as a "hazer"- a horse who is ridden parallel with the steer to ensure it runs in a straight line. He was only switched to the main role when one of Linderman's other horses was injured.

Championships

Harley May 
Harley May had already won two titles (1952, 1956) and had been Professional Rodeo Cowboys Association (PRCA) president in 1958-1959 and 1961 before teaming up with the eight-year-old Scottie in 1965. They made a good team and thus they got to the championship together. By the end of the year Harley got a 3rd world title and Scottie got his first of three cowboys to a  championship.

Jack Roddy 
Jack Roddy was a powerful force in  steer wrestling  with good efforts. But finally he had the mount of a lifetime when he showed Scottie. In 1966 and 1968 Jack and Scottie galloped on to get the championship honor for both years.

John W. Jones Sr. 
By 1970 Scottie still was not stopping and, at the age of thirteen, he got one last cowboy who he needed  to gallop to a championship. His name was John W. Jones Sr., and the gelding carried him to his first championship. Jones later said in a 1973 Hoofs and Horns article that "Scottie is the all-time great steer wrestling horse in my book. He’s the best horse to mount people because he can take so many runs without tiring. It seems like the more runs he makes, the stronger he gets. There’s no horse I’ve ever seen that was in his class."

National Finals Rodeo appearances 
From 1964–1973 Scottie performed at the National Finals Rodeo. He won six average titles, and had three second place finishes.

Other wins 
Although he retired from top-level competition after 1970, Scottie proved a useful partner for less experienced riders. In 1971 Scottie carried Lynn Perry to a win the College National Finals Rodeo. Then at the age of 20  he carried Troy Yetter to a championship in the National High School Rodeo Association in 1977. After that he lived in retirement for four years in Montana until his death at the age of 24.

References 

1957 animal births
1981 animal deaths
Horses in the United States
Rodeo horses
ProRodeo Hall of Fame inductees